Dùn Galláin is a promontory fort located on the Inner Hebridean island of Colonsay, Scotland.

The fort overlooks the natural harbours of Tobar Fuar and Port Lobh. A battle between the islands inhabitants and invaders at Traigh an Tobair Fhuair took place to the north of Dùn Galláin.

Citations

External links

Archaeological sites in the Southern Inner Hebrides
Promontory forts in Scotland
Colonsay
Former populated places in Scotland
Scheduled monuments in Scotland